Tautology may refer to:

Tautology (language), redundant statements in literature and rhetoric
Tautology (logic), in formal logic, a statement that is true in every possible interpretation
Tautology (rule of inference), a rule of replacement for logical expressions

See also
Pleonasm
Redundancy (disambiguation)
Tautological (disambiguation)
Tautonym, a scientific name of a species in which both parts of the name have the same spelling

hu:Tautológia#Nyelvtudományi és irodalmi tautológia